Doris Runge (born Carlow, July 15, 1943) is a German writer.

She was the daughter of a manufacturer whose business was expropriated after World War II. Her family moved to Neukirchen in Schleswig-Holstein in 1953, and he attended schools in Oldenburg and Lübeck before following high education in Kiel where she became a teacher. She married the painter Jürgen Runge (1929–1992) and they divorced in 1981. They couple used to live partially in Ibiza during the 1970s. She organizes there readings with important contemporary authors. Runge has been continuously publishing poetry books since 1981. She has an international standing (translations into Portuguese, American and Czech).

Prizes
 1985, Friedrich-Hebbel-Preis for Jagdlied
 1997, Friedrich-Hölderlin-Preis
 1998, Kunstpreis des Landes Schleswig-Holstein
 1998, Poetry Liliencron Lecturer University of Kiel
 1999, Poetik-Professur an der Universität Bamberg
 2007, Ida-Dehmel-Literaturpreis
 2009, Honorary Professor in Schleswig-Holstein

Works
 Kunst-Märchen, Berlin, 1977
 Liedschatten, Cismar, 1981
 Jagdlied, Stuttgart, 1985
 Der Vogel, der morgens singt, Cork, 1985
 Kommt Zeit, Stuttgart, 1988
 Wintergrün, Stuttgart, 1991
 Grund genug, Stuttgart, 1995
 Welch ein Weib ! , Stuttgart, 1998
 Trittfeste Schatten, Stuttgart, 2000
 Du also, Munich, 2003
 Die Dreizehnte, Munich, 2007
 Was da auftaucht. Gedichte, Deutsche Verlagsanstalt, Munich 2010, 
 Zwischen Tür und Engel, Deutsche Verlagsanstalt, Munich 2013, 
 man könnte sich ins blau verlieben Wallstein Verlag, Göttingen 2017,

References

External links
 

1943 births
Living people
German women writers